Talking Friends is an American computer-animated web mini-series that premiered on June 8, 2012, on YouTube and Disney.com. Based on the popular app series of the same name by Outfit7 Limited, it is the first television installment in the Talking Tom franchise, and would be the only one to be produced in association with The Walt Disney Company. The series ended on August 31, 2012.

A second series iteration, titled Talking Tom & Friends, would eventually be produced and released by Outfit7 on April 30, 2015, to coincide with the reboot. This series however, was noticeably produced without the involvement of Disney, with characters receiving redesigns and the original respective voices also being recast along with Pierre and Gina being omitted and replaced by a new character known as Hank.

Characters
Talking Tom (voiced by Michael Tauzin) - A gray tabby cat, newscaster, Ginger's uncle and Angela's boyfriend.
Talking Ben (voiced by Michael D. Cohen) - A tan dog, genius, scientist and newscaster.
Talking Pierre (voiced by Keith Ferguson) - A green parrot who likes to play video games and gets easily annoyed by the others, particularly Tom.
Talking Ginger (voiced by Michael Tauzin) - A mischievous and curious orange tabby cat and Tom's nephew.
Talking Angela (voiced by Susannah Hillard) - A white cat, singer and Tom's girlfriend.

Additionally, Talking Gina appears as a plush toy.

Production

Development
According to The New York Times, various studios including DreamWorks Animation, 20th Century Fox (later acquired by Disney in 2019) and Nickelodeon had the chance to adapt the franchise in film or television before passing on the opportunity, until Disney Interactive took the offer.

Principal photography for the series commenced from November 2011 to June 2012.

Music
Alfred Montejano composed the ending theme.

Release
The series premiere and remaining episodes were uploaded onto Disney's official YouTube channel, serving as the debut of their YouTube channel starting on June 8, 2012. It was also shown on Disney.com. The series finale aired two months later on August 31, 2012.

Marketing
To help promote the series, Outfit7 created an app exclusive to iOS devices known as Talking Friends Cartoons that featured all ten episodes, as well as additional content including descriptions of the characters and downloable wallpapers. The app, however, garnered controversy with some of the advertisements. For instance, a banner displayed at the bottom of the screen while the app was launched directed users to take part in quizzes that included prizes such as a 64GB iPad, which were unable to be completed unless users would spend monthly fees for a membership service. This ultimately resulted in many people feeling upset over the product as well as leaving many parents frustrated over the concerns.

Additionally two songs were released by Walt Disney Records. The first, titled You Get Me was released to promote Tom Loves Angela, and the second, titled That's Falling in Love, was released to promote Talking Angela. The music video for You Get Me was produced by ARX Anima, Walt Disney Interactive Media Group and Outfit7 and released on June 12, 2012, by Walt Disney Records. The scenes featured were originally produced for the music video and were not taken from any existing clips in the series. The music video was, however, was animated in the same style as the series. A teaser video for That's Falling in Love was also later released by Disney Music on December 6, 2012.

A live performance event also took place in Hollywood that featured DJs from Radio Disney, plush toy giveaways and performers dressed and wearing makeup to portray the characters to promote the Talking Friends Superstars toyline.

Episodes

Notes

References

Talking Tom & Friends
Animated television series about cats
Animated television series about dogs
Animated television series about birds
2012 web series debuts
2012 web series endings
Animated series based on video games
Television series by Disney
Works based on video games
Disney Interactive
2010s American animated television series
2010s American animated television miniseries
American children's animated comedy television series
English-language television shows